Octagon is a  tall, 49-storey residential skyscraper under construction in Birmingham, England. The building is part of the Paradise redevelopment scheme in the city centre and is designed by Glenn Howells Architects. Due to its unique design, Octagon is envisaged by its developers as becoming a landmark building for the city. The building will house 364 homes, being 1 bed, 2 bed and 3 bed apartments. 

On completion, the building will become the tallest octagonal-shaped residential skyscraper in the world and the tallest building in Birmingham.

History
The planning application for Octagon was submitted to Birmingham City Council in October 2020.

Octagon was unanimously approved by the Council in April 2021, with 11 votes for and 0 against. A Section 106 agreement between the Council, Paradise Circus Limited Partnership and Britel Fund Trustees was signed in August 2021.

Construction of the building commenced in March 2022.

See also
List of tallest buildings in the United Kingdom
List of tallest buildings and structures in the Birmingham Metropolitan Area, West Midlands

References 

Unfinished buildings and structures
Buildings and structures in Birmingham, West Midlands